K89 or K-89 may refer to:

K-89 (Kansas highway), a state highway in Kansas
INS Nirghat (K89), a former Indian Navy ship